is a 2005 anime OVA as well as a 2006-2007 anime television series.

Story

Long, long ago, there existed a world of magic and science. But having both powers was making people conceited and lazy. So God split the world in to the world of science, Erde (German for Earth), and the world of magic, Phandavale. One day in Phandavale, a terrible witch named Cendrillon revives. Cendrillon plots to rule both worlds, and searches for the "key of Erde" and the "key of Phandavale" which holds tremendous power.

A young boy from Erde by the name of Sōta meets a mysterious girl from Phandavale, Akazukin (Red Riding Hood), and her talking wolf companion, Val. Sōta learns that he is the key of Erde. Now it is up to Akazukin, Val, and the other Musketeers, Shirayukihime (Snow White) and Ibara (Sleeping Beauty) to protect Sōta from Cendrillon and her Nightmarians who wish to obtain the power he mysteriously possesses.

Characters

The titular heroine from the magic world Phandavale (Magic). She is one of the Three Musketeers, and has come to the Erde world to protect Souta who holds the Erde Key. She uses magic, but her speciality seems to be physical attacks. She can control fire magic. Later on she gets an upgrade in her powers when the Three Musketeers try to obtain the ultimate magic. She was the one that received it, and when she activated it she called it Princess Mode, due to the fact it makes her look like a princess like the other two Musketeers. The power is like the other card magic she usually uses. The only thing is, it does not stay active all the time, only when used. She was born in Vise village, the same village where she met Val for the first time: the morning after the village was destroyed. Eleven years before the story, the village was destroyed by werewolves led by Jed. Jed attacked the village to kill his younger brother Cain, who is really Val. During the destruction, she lost her parents and Cain's mother. She has some feelings for Souta. Age: 14. Voiced by: Yukari Tamura

The protagonist from the real world Erde (Science). He has a tendency to talk to flowers in the morning on his way to school, and after talking to them they mysteriously become more charming. He cares about the flowers a lot, and they help him out in return. Souta seems to have some power of his own: this was first discovered in an attempt to save Ringo from falling by Hansel's push (he unknowingly used an unknown flash and destroyed every opposing monster in the building). After he used it, he did not realize that he contained that power and thought it was Shiryuki's. He also reacted to a story card given to him by an elderly lady. So far he has collected 5 story cards of the Two World fairy tale stories (which tells the story of how Marlene turned into Cendrillon and the reason for her hatred). He is a kind and caring person, who can tell good people from bad. He is also smart and helps out in situations that the group befalls. His key power is activated whenever he feels strong emotion. He is the key of Erde, because his mother Soya was one of the sages who defeated Cendrillon 1000 years ago, and went to Erde afterwards to give birth to the child who would be safer in Erde then Phandavale. Age: 14. Voiced by: Motoko Kumai (OVA and TV 1-25), Yūko Sanpei (TV 26+)

From the magic world Phandavale. She is also one of the Three Musketeers, and came to Souta to protect him. She uses intellectual magic, as she was top in her magic classes. Her specialty is magic attacks. She likes Souta and always hugs him or tries to get close to him, much to Ringo's dismay. She can control ice magic and water magic. She is a princess as her name suggests; however after her father remarried to a woman controlled by Cendrillon, the kingdom was taken away. Age: 14 Voiced by: Kanako Tateno

Souta's childhood friend, who is very close to him. She wakes him up in the morning. She is the only one who understands Souta when he talks to flowers. She also worries about him a lot, and does not want to be away from him, like when Souta was going to go to Phandavale. She gets angry whenever Shirayuki clings on to Souta. She is a very good cook, especially with meat and potatoes. She has a crush on Souta. Age: 14. Voiced by: Rie Kugimiya

Akazukin's companion who fights alongside her. He, like Akazukin, loves food from Erde, and even at serious moments would worry about food first. He seems to dislike Jed-same, a Lycan (werewolf). This was noticed when Souta was going to tell him that he saw a Lycan named Jed, and Val stopped him from saying it. He is Cain, Akazukin's childhood friend and Jed's younger brother, but ever since the night he was wounded by Jed, he lost the ability to transform into human form. Age: approximately 20. Voiced by: Nobuyuki Hiyama

From the magic world Phandavale. She is the 3rd of the Three Musketeers. She represents Sleeping Beauty, hence the reason she is usually half asleep. She uses a thorn whip to attack. Since her specialty is the Earth element, she can heal plants. It's discovered later that she is actually the princess of the Elf race, and was born with a magic talent, unlike those who have to learn it. She is always sleepy because she does not sleep at night; if she does her magic would go out of control and hurt people. Age: 14. Voiced by: Miyuki Sawashiro

She is the evil witch that is trying to get Erde's key. Her real name is Marlene. In the beginning she was good, but ever since the boy she liked from Erde had to go back she started to hate the concept of two worlds. Her hatred grew when one day she found a way to get to Erde and saw through the mirror that the person she liked was now with another girl. This led her to aim for dark magic and get revenge on God. Her final transformation to Cenderillon happened when the boy she loved came back to stop her, got in the way of an attack and died. Age: unknown. Voiced by: Misa Watanabe

One of Cendrillon's minor servants, who is no threat to the main cast. He tries to capture Souta many times but always fails. He has three followers, and as a group they use musical magic. They are the Town Musicians of Bremen. He always carries a backpack with canned food with him. His aim is to be in Cendrillon's main army. Age: 100+. Voiced by: Akiko Kobayashi

He hates the weak, and even goes far as making his sister (who was hurt) feel bad. He was taught dark magic by Cendrillon, and the more he learned, the less he cared for his sister. Before he met Cendrillon, he was kind to his sister and others. It turns out he was controlled by Cendrillon and returned to normal (being the kind, loving brother) when Akazukin and co help save him. Age: 17. Voiced by: Kaori Shimizu (OVA, TV (as a child)), Daisuke Hirakawa

/
She is Hansel's sister and cares for him. In the beginning she transferred into Souta's school and acted like a nice girl in front of him, but it was soon found out it was a trap to try to kidnap Souta. After losing the first fight against Akazukin and Shirayuki, she has tried to capture Souta many times in order to be acknowledged by her brother. It seems that when she and her brother were lost in the Forest of Okashi, they used to be on good terms, living in a house built of candy. All she really wants is to go back to being how they used to be, instead of fighting for Cendrillon. Even though she is an enemy, Souta always treats her nicely and even protects her, because he knows that she is a good person. Age: 13. Voiced by: Sayuri Yahagi

He is a Leaf Knight who guarded the Phandavale Castle. He was given orders from the King to wait at the captured castle until Souta the key holder came, and tell him, "I believe in you"(meaning the King believes Souta will save the magic world). After he finished his mission, he went his own way to try to save the King on his own, for he prefers doing things alone. He specializes in musical magic. He hates pumpkins because of Akazukin, as she used to wear a pumpkin mask when she was little and scared him with it, and ever since he has been afraid of them. He seems to have feelings for Ringo. Age: 15. Voiced by: Kenji Nojima

King Fernando
He is the King of Phandavale as well Phandavale's Key. He is a kind hearted person (as described by the Three Musketeers). In the series, he spends most of his time in Cendrillon's castle as a prisoner. Even though he is in prison, he continues to smile and stay optimistic. He also has the ability to control wind magic. Age: 17. Voiced by: Hideki Tasaka

Trude
Servant of Cendrillon. She is actually Souta's mother manipulated by Cendrillon's dark magic. She can turn anyone who looks into her eyes into a doll, as well as turn anything to stone. Voiced by: Kaori Shimizu

Episodes

 2006-07-01
 2006-07-08
 2006-07-15
 2006-07-22
 2006-07-29
 2006-08-05
 2006-08-12
 2006-08-19
 2006-08-26
 2006-09-02
 2006-09-09
 2006-09-16
 2006-09-23
 2006-09-30
 2006-10-07
 2006-10-14
 2006-10-21
 2006-10-28
 2006-11-04
 2006-11-11
 2006-11-18
 2006-11-25
 2006-12-02
 2006-12-09
 2006-12-16
 2006-12-23
 2007-01-06
 2007-01-13
 2007-01-20
 2007-01-27
 2007-02-03
 2007-02-10
 2007-02-17
 2007-02-24
 2007-03-03
 2007-03-10
 2007-03-17
 2007-03-24
 2007-03-31

Theme songs
OVA
Opening theme "Ever-Never-Land" by Yukari Tamura
Ending theme "Clover" by marhy

Television series
Opening theme 1  by Yukari Tamura
Opening theme 2 "Princess Rose" by Yukari Tamura
Ending theme 1 "Clover" by marhy
Ending theme 2  by Yukari Tamura, Kanako Tateno and Miyuki Sawashiro
Ending theme 3 "CROSS ROAD" by marhy
Episode 18 Happy Loop by Yukari Tamura
Episode 18 Jasmine no Namida by Kanako Tateno
Episode 18 Yumesaki Garden by Miyuki Sawashiro

Special video Sympathy by Sayuri Yahagi (Watchable on YouTube by typing in "Otogi Jushi Akazukin - Sympathy")

Merchandising
The television series features a fair amount of merchandising tie-ins, such as the "sweet phones" used for casting most magic spells by inserting cards. Akazukin acquires a transformation sequence, with little change to her costume.

References

External links
Official web site for Otogi-Jushi Akazukin
 

2005 anime OVAs
2006 anime television series debuts
Konami
Madhouse (company)
TV Tokyo original programming